The discography of American electronica project Owl City consists of six studio albums, seven extended plays, twenty singles (including three as a featured artist), and twelve music videos. Owl City issued its debut release, the extended play Of June, in September 2007; it peaked at number 15 on the United States Billboard Dance/Electronic Albums chart. His debut studio album Maybe I'm Dreaming followed in December 2008, peaking at number 13 on the Dance/Electronic Albums chart. Following the success of Of June and Maybe I'm Dreaming, Young signed to Universal Republic Records in late 2008. His second studio album and major-label debut, Ocean Eyes, was released in July 2009. "Fireflies", the album's lead single, became an international success, peaking at number one on the US Billboard Hot 100 and becoming a top ten hit in several other countries. In correlation with the success of "Fireflies", Ocean Eyes peaked at number eight on the US Billboard 200 and was later certified platinum by the Recording Industry Association of America (RIAA). An additional three singles were released from the album: "Vanilla Twilight", "Hello Seattle", and "Umbrella Beach".

Owl City's third studio album All Things Bright and Beautiful was released in June 2011, peaking at number six on the Billboard 200 and selling 143,000 copies. The album produced six singles, with "Alligator Sky" and "Lonely Lullaby" managing to chart on the US Billboard Bubbling Under Hot 100 Singles chart. "Good Time", a collaboration with Canadian recording artist Carly Rae Jepsen, peaked at number eight on the Billboard Hot 100 and became a top ten chart hit in countries such as Australia, Canada, and the United Kingdom. Owl City released his fourth studio album The Midsummer Station in August 2012; it peaked at number seven on the Billboard 200. On July 10, 2015, Owl City released his fifth album, titled Mobile Orchestra, spawning the singles "You're Not Alone", "Verge", and "Unbelievable". Owl City's sixth studio album, Cinematic, was released on June 1, 2018.

Albums

Studio albums

Compilation albums

Live albums

Extended plays

Singles

As lead artist

As featured artist

Promotional singles

Other charted songs

Guest appearances

Music videos

As lead artist

Notes

References

External links
 Official website
 Owl City at AllMusic
 
 

Discographies of American artists
Pop music discographies
Discography